Artist Sanna Jalomäki is a Finnish Australian singer, songwriter, painter and formally trained actress.

After entering the acting program at Tampere University of Technology in Finland in 1991, she worked as a professional actress for over a decade appearing on national and international television.
From December 2008 to January 2011 she lived in Athens, where she started painting specializing in portraiture. Her subject matter focuses on people and their environments. 
Since 2011 she has lived in Finland where she works as an artist and adult educator. 
In 2015 she completed her master's degree in Theatre Arts (Tampere University via the Theatre Academy in Helsinki).

Education
 Quinninup School 
 Bondi Beach Public School, Sydney, Australia 
 Sarah Redfern High School, Sydney, Australia 
 Department of Theatrical Arts (NÄTY), University of Tampere, Finland  (Bachelor of Arts degree incomplete)
 The Transmission Project (European Union sponsored pilot programme), London, England

Acting
 Pimeän Hehku (Kiss of Plutonium), TV2, 1996 Finland
 Taikapeili, TV2, 1995-1997 Finland
 Dialogi kahdelle, theatre play, Ylioppilasteatteri, Helsinki, 1996 Finland
 Hyväntekijät, movie, 1997 Finland
 Kiima- muodonmuutoksia, voiceover, Museum of Natural History, Helsinki University 2000
 Ota ja Omista, MTV3, 1997 Finland
 Herra Valo, theatre production, 1994 Finland
 Matka Viipuriin, movie, 1994 Finland

Music
Singer/songwriter for alternative pop-rock band Sansibar 2013-

Songwriter and lead singer in rock band 'mute8', Helsinki, Finland 2004-2008.

Exhibitions

 SANNA at A Series of Paintings 2009-2010 at The Finnish Institute at Athens 22.2 - 6.3.2010 her solo exhibition as part of events celebrating the 25th anniversary of the institute, Athens, Greece
 SANNA at MOZart Café Gallery 10 - 23.11.2010 solo exhibition, Nea Kifissia, Athens, Greece
 SANNA at Arkadia 16.6 - 7.7.2011 solo exhibition, Helsinki, Finland
 SANNA at Rytmi 3.10-3.12.2011 solo exhibition, Helsinki, Finland
 SANNA The Greek Collection at Kitch 1-30.11.2011 solo exhibition, Helsinki, Finland
 TRKCrew at Helsinki Underground Art Weekend Festival (HUA) 11–13.5.2012
 Eco-Art Exhibition Blobs 'n' Scraps (with fellow artist Sinivuokko Koivula) at Gallery Kalleria, Helsinki, 19.7-2.8.2012
 TRKCrew at Artwheels, Night of the Arts, Helsinki, Finland 8.2012
 TRKCrew at Parkkipäivä, Esplanade, Helsinki, Finland 9.2012
 TRKCrew at Valon juhla, Torikorttelit, Kiseleff Building, Helsinki, Finland 10.2012
 SANNA at S-ikkunagalleria, Sokos Department store, Helsinki, Finland 3.9-14.10.2012
 SANNA at TOHONO, Gallery and Design store, Helsinki, Finland 11.12.2012-3.1.2013
 TRKCrew at Rytmi Helsinki, Finland 8.4-18.5.2013
 SANNA at Kirjasto 10 exhibition space, Postitalo, Helsinki, Finland 22.4-5.5.2013

Charity and other projects
Concert project manager for Rock Against Child Abuse, (RACP Finland) as well as a member of the International RACP core team. RACP Finland charity concert 19.1.2008 Nosturi, Helsinki, Finland
Founder of PIRJO & PURJO PRODUCTIONS (PPP-Art ry) with designer Sinivuokko Koivula, 2012 onwards. Created the youth art project Watts On the Wall (W.O.W 2012) - funded by the Ministry of Education and Culture of Finland with the Minister of Sports and Culture Paavo Arhinmäki as the project's official guardian.

External links
-Sanna Jalomäki, Wikipedia Finnish
Facebook SANNA pages
http://www.yle.fi/kotikatu/

http://www.sannart.weebly.com/
TRKCrew video
https://web.archive.org/web/20150109153140/http://pirjopurjoproductions.fi/

Living people
Finnish emigrants to Australia
Year of birth missing (living people)
Singers from Helsinki
Finnish women singer-songwriters
20th-century Finnish painters
21st-century Finnish painters
Actresses from Helsinki